Cornwall, formerly known as Cornwall Station, was an unincorporated community in Contra Costa County, California, before it was absorbed into the City of Pittsburg.

The area appears to have been named after Pierre Barlow Cornwall, an early California pioneer and president of the Black Diamond Coal Mining Company at nearby Nortonville, California from 1872 to 1904. Cornwall sprung up at the intersection of two railroads, the Black Diamond Coal Mining Railroad and the San Pablo and Tulare Railroad (the latter became part of the Southern Pacific system in 1888).  The coal railroad crossed the San Pablo and Tulare line using an overhead trestle.

A post office operated at Cornwall Station from 1881 to 1888. Cornwall post office operated from 1890 to 1911.

The Cornwall area, together with the nearby town of Black Diamond, was officially renamed "Pittsburg" on February 11, 1911, which may explain why the Cornwall Post Office stopped operations in that same year.

References

External links
 Pierre Barlow Cornwall, 1821-1904
 Life Sketch of Pierre Barlow Cornwall, written by his son Bruce Cornwall, 1906
 Black Diamond Mines Regional Preserve, part of the East Bay Park District

Unincorporated communities in California
Unincorporated communities in Contra Costa County, California